Tarja is a Finnish female given name.

Given name
Tarja (given name)

Other
Tarja (album), a 2004 album by German neofolk group Sonne Hagal.
Tarja (folk poetry contest), a Bengal folk poetry contest.
Tarja (island), an Estonian island.
Tarja Turunen, Finnish Singer/Songwriter.